Ryūō ('dragon king') is an annual Japanese professional shogi tournament and the title of its winner. It may also refer to:

Ryūjin, the mythological sovereign of the Ryūgū-jō ("Dragon Palace")
Ryūō, Shiga, a former town in Gamō District, Shiga Prefecture, Japan
Ryūō, Yamanashi, a former town in Nakakoma District, Yamanashi Prefecture, Japan
Ryūō Station, a railway station in Kai, Yamanashi Prefecture, Japan
Ryuoo Ropeway, an aerial lift in Yamanouchi, Nagano Prefecture, Japan
Ryūō Noboru (born 1983), Mongolian sumo wrestler

See also
The Ryuo's Work Is Never Done!, a Japanese light novel series